The First Stage of the 2008 Copa Santander Libertadores began on January 29 and ended on February 12. Twelve teams qualified directly on this stage.

Results
Team #1 played the second leg at home.

Matches

First leg

Second Leg

Lanús and Olmedo tied 3–3 on points. Lanús advanced on goal difference.

Cruzeiro advanced 6–0 on points.

Mineros de Guayana and Arsenal tied 3–3 on points. Arsenal advanced on goal difference.

La Paz and Atlas tied 3–3 on points. Atlas advanced on goal difference.

Cienciano advanced 4–1 on points.

Boyacá Chicó and Audax Italiano tied 3–3 on points. Audax Italiano advanced on away goals.

References

External links
 Official Site Copa Libertadores
 Coverage at foxsports.com

First Stage